Fragaria virginiana, known as Virginia strawberry, wild strawberry, common strawberry, or mountain strawberry, is a North American strawberry that grows across much of the United States and southern Canada. It is one of the two species of wild strawberry that were hybridized to create the modern domesticated garden strawberry (Fragaria × ananassa).

Subspecies
There are four recognized subspecies:
Fragaria virginiana subsp.  (formerly known as F. ovalis)
Fragaria virginiana subsp. grayana
Fragaria virginiana subsp. platypetala
Fragaria virginiana subsp. virginiana

Cytology

All strawberries have a base haploid count of 7 chromosomes. Fragaria virginiana is octoploid, having eight sets of these chromosomes for a total of 56. These eight genomes pair as four distinct sets, of two different types, with little or no pairing between sets. The genome composition of the octoploid strawberry species has generally been indicated as AAA'A'BBB'B'. The A-type genomes were likely contributed by diploid ancestors related to Fragaria vesca or similar species, while the B-type genomes seem to descend from a close relative of Fragaria iinumae. The exact process of hybridization and speciation which resulted in the octoploid species is still unknown, but it appears that the genome compositions of both Fragaria chiloensis and Fragaria virginiana (and by extension their hybrid, the cultivated octoploid garden strawberry as well) are identical.

Description
The plant typically bears numerous trifoliate leaves that are green on top, pale green on the lower surface. The leaflet is oval shaped and has coarse teeth along the edge except near the bottom. This plant has a five-petaled white flower with numerous pistils, surrounded by yellow-anthered stamens. There are ten small green sepals under the petals. The seeds of this plant are developed from the pistils in the centre of the flower which will become dark-coloured fruit (achenes) on the strawberry. The fruit of the wild strawberry is smaller than that of the garden strawberry (Fragaria × ananassa). Botanically, the fruit is classified as an aggregate accessory fruit, but it is commonly called a berry. Strawberries reproduce both sexually by seed, and asexually by runners (stolons).

Taxonomy
Fragaria virginiana  Mill. is considered to be the valid name for this plant  by a  number of authorities (and was described by Philip Miller in 1768 in the eighth edition of The Gardeners Dictionary). According to the International Plant Names Index the name, Fragaria virginiana Duchesne, published by Antoine Nicolas Duchesne in 1766, is an invalid name. However, other authorities consider the valid name to be Fragaria virginiana Duchesne.

Uses
The berries are edible. A popular type called "Little Scarlet" is grown in Great Britain, having been imported from the United States in the early 1900s.

Similar species
The plants resemble Hesperochiron pumilus, but have distinct leaves and more than five stamens.

References

External links
 
 

virginiana
Flora of North America
Plants described in 1766